Network Computing Devices (NCD) was a company founded in 1987 to produce a new class of products now known as a thin client. It was founded in Mountain View, CA, and when it closed it was headquartered in Beaverton, Oregon.

The corporate founders were Mike Harrigan, Doug Klein, Dave Cornelius, Ed Basart, Martin Eberhard, and Kevin Martin.

At that time these devices were known as network terminals or X Terminals. Judith Estrin and William Carrico joined the company about 6 months after its founding as its new CEO and executive vice president, and led the company through its IPO in 1992. The products were some of the earliest examples of a thin client and providing remote access to data in something other than ASCII as was common with traditional terminals of the time.

The X Protocol provided a way to show high-resolution images of data and graphics over a network connection. NCD supported a range of network protocols including TCP/IP, Token Ring, DECnet and others.

Acquisitions 
NCD purchased PCXware, which made an X Window System for Microsoft Windows.

NCD purchased Z-Code Software in 1994. Z-Code made Z-Mail, a cross platform open standards email client. Z-Mail was later sold by NCD to Netmanage.

NCD purchased TekXPress X-terminals line from Tektronix.

NCD ceased operations in 2004. However, a few of the company's employees have set up a new company, ThinPATH Systems, to provide former NCD customers and others with service, support and products.

See also
DESQview/X, a similar product

References

External links 
Welcome to NCD – The Thin Client Experts!
NCD X-Terminal HOWTO
National Semiconductor & NCD to Jointly Develop Information Appliances Business Wire, Nov 14, 2000
Network Computing Devices – NCD – Acknowledged by Australian Government Technology Productivity Award Business Wire, March 28, 2001
Network Computing Devices, Inc. Introduces NCD ThinPATH PC; New Software Manages PCs as Thin Clients, Reducing the Total Cost of Ownership of the Desktop Business Wire, March 27, 2002
NCD is Finalist in The Computing Industry Awards 2002; Newly Launched ThinPATH PC is Selected as a Finalist in the Computing Industry Awards Business Wire, August 13, 2002

1987 establishments in California
2004 disestablishments in Oregon
American companies established in 1987
American companies disestablished in 2004
Companies based in Mountain View, California
Companies based in Portland, Oregon
Computer companies established in 1987
Computer companies disestablished in 2004
Defunct companies based in Oregon
Defunct companies based in the San Francisco Bay Area
Defunct computer companies of the United States
Defunct computer hardware companies
Technology companies based in the San Francisco Bay Area
Technology companies established in 1987
Technology companies disestablished in 2004
Thin clients
X Window System